Cameron James Borgas (born 1 September 1983 in Adelaide, South Australia) is a former Australian cricketer who played for the Southern Redbacks and Adelaide Strikers. He was a right-handed middle order batsman and has previously represented Australia at under 19 level. He also played A grade cricket for Sturt District Cricket Club.

He was just 17 years old when first contracted by the Redbacks. He played a couple of games in 2000–01 but it was in 2005–06 that he showed his talent with maiden century of 140 against Tasmania. That was followed with an innings of 149 against New South Wales at Adelaide Oval. Borgas also played a part in their one-day campaign in which they narrowly lost the final.

On 15 October 2006, he was the hero in the last over as they beat NSW in a one-day game. With 18 required off the final over, he hit three sixes as they won with two balls remaining. He finished unbeaten on 31 off 9. In January 2011, Borgas was named man of the match in the Redbacks Big Bash Grand Final victory over the NSW Blues, making 62 not out off 39 balls.

In 2012, Borgas became a freelance Twenty20 cricketer and has since played in tournaments in Sri Lanka, New Zealand, Bangladesh, Netherlands, England and Hong Kong as well as in Australia where he has signed a 3-year contract to play for the Sydney Thunder in the Big Bash League.

He also has the unique record of having represented 3 countries, having played for Scotland and Netherlands as their overseas player in the English County one day competition and also for Australia in the Hong Kong Sixes.

Borgas is married to Australian television presenter Alice Monfries.

See also
 List of South Australian representative cricketers

References

External links

 

1983 births
Adelaide Strikers cricketers
Australian cricketers
Living people
Rangpur Riders cricketers
Scotland cricketers
South Australia cricketers
Cricketers from Adelaide
Sydney Thunder cricketers
Basnahira Cricket Dundee cricketers
Wellington cricketers
People educated at Immanuel College, Adelaide
Netherlands cricketers